The 1978 Suitland National Archives Film Vault Fire was a fire at the Suitland National Archives Film Vault on December 7, 1978. The fire destroyed 12.6 million feet of Universal Pictures newsreel footage from 1929 to 1967, including film of the bombing of Pearl Harbor, other World War II combat footage and film from the time of The Great Depression.

Background
The films stored in the vault were donated by Universal Pictures in 1970. When the nitrate film was moved to the vaults, fire safety improvements such as sprinkler systems were also added.

Fire
Workers, who were upgrading the building's air conditioning had disabled several sprinkler heads in the building. According to a government report, the fire started when one of the workers' power tools sparked. The workers claimed that the fire was caused by an old air conditioning system. The fire started at around 12 p.m. The Suitland fire department responded to a 911 call in minutes, but films in 21 vaults ended up getting destroyed. The firefighters opened the fireproof doors, allowing the fire to spread while looking for people who could be trapped inside.

References

1978 fires in the United States
Building and structure fires in the United States
Fires in Maryland
1978 in Maryland
Lost American films
Lost historical records
Nitrate-film fires in the United States